The Chang Foundation Museum is an art museum in Zhongzheng District, Taipei, Taiwan.

History
The museum was opened in May 1991.

Architecture
The museum building covers an exhibition area of 1,500 m2 divided into five exhibition rooms.

Exhibitions
The museum houses ancient Chinese art pieces from various collections of the Chang family, Han Dynasty ceramics etc.

Transportation
The museum is accessible within walking distance north from Dongmen Station of the Taipei Metro.

See also
 List of museums in Taiwan

References

1991 establishments in Taiwan
Art museums and galleries in Taiwan
Museums established in 1991
Museums in Taipei